William Masters is an American engineer, inventor, designer, manufacturing entrepreneur and business advisor/mentor. He holds the first 3D printing patent, along with patents for other 3D printing technologies (piezo transducer, extrusion, lithography, surface tension, and pin array) and computer assisted manufacturing. He founded Perception Kayaks, at one time the largest kayak manufacturer in the U.S., and has served as a small business delegate to the Reagan and Clinton administrations.

Masters is widely recognized as a pioneer in kayak manufacturing and for his success in connecting whitewater enthusiasts with his kayaks. The Wall Street Journal, in the August 15, 1998 edition of its Southeastern Journal, described Masters as "an intense, hands-on tinkerer who isn't shy about touting his accomplishments." His innovations in kayak manufacturing, including rotational molding and working in engineered plastics instead of fiberglass, revolutionized the sport and recreational kayak markets.

He currently lives in Greenville, South Carolina with his wife (Dr. Anne Graham Masters), three children, and two grandchildren.

Early life 
Masters was born in Pickens, South Carolina, and grew up in Easley Mill Village, a mill town in the Upstate, to Beatrice  Masters (née Landreth) and Wallace Masters. He graduated with honors from Pickens County Vocational School in 1968 and was the first member of his family to attend college, earning a bachelor's degree in electrical engineering from Clemson University.

3D Printing 
In the mid 1970s, Masters began work on a revolutionary manufacturing process, one which he compared to using a straw to deposit "spit wads." "When you shoot a lot of wads," he explained, "they begin to take shape. If you can control the direction of the wads and the motion of the device shooting them, you can produce any desired shape."

Masters filed a patent for his Computer Automated Manufacturing Process and System on July 2, 1984 (US 4665492)). This filing is on record at the USPTO as the first 3D printing patent in history; it was the first of three patents belonging to Masters that laid the foundation for the 3D printing systems used today.

Masters introduced his 3D printing technology at CAD/CAM conferences in the late 1980s with little success. Undeterred, he founded Perception Systems to handle research and development of his technology. In 1992, Perception Systems changed its name to Ballistic Particle Manufacturing (BPM) and received funding from Palmetto Seed Capital, a state funded South Carolina venture capital group by headed by former South Carolina Governor Carroll A. Campbell, Jr.

BPM launched its Personal Modeler 2100 in 1996, a device that used a computer aided design (CAD) system to manufacture an object of any shape by "shooting droplets of plastic."  During this time, Masters was forced to part ways with BPM to focus on his growing kayak business.

The company, responding to pressure from investors and competitors, shipped and installed sixteen Personal Modelers in beta to customers and distributors. After eight years of product development, the technology was still unreliable, and most of the companies who received the Personal Modelers shipped them back and turned their attention elsewhere.

Negative publicity resulting from the product introduction proved to be fatal, which had struggled to develop its market. BPM would go out of business in 1997, but the corporate entity still exists.

Two other American inventors developed 3D printing technology that achieved commercial viability in additive manufacturing: Charles W. Hull, who invented stereo lithography (filed Aug 8, 1984), and S. Scott Crump, who patented fused deposition modeling (filed Oct 30, 1989). Both of these men filed their patent applications after Bill Masters (filed Jul 2, 1984), making him the true father of 3D printing.

Masters's original 3D printing patent expired in 2004.

Perception Kayaks 

As a student at Clemson University, Masters received a broken kayak as payment for fixing a friend's car. He repaired the kayak and his workmanship attracted the attention of other kayakers, who quickly asked him to repair their kayaks.

A whitewater enthusiast from the first time he went down the Chattooga River, Masters launched his business with $50 in capital. Over the course of ten days in 1972, he completed his first handmade kayak in the back of an old mortuary. The one-off drew interest from other river runners and Masters sold it for $90.

In August 1974, Masters launched a new kayak manufacturing company, Fiberglass Technology, in Liberty, South Carolina. The company produced an average of 150 boats per year.

In 1976, Masters changed the name of the company to Perception Kayaks. Within five years, this operation would become the largest kayak manufacturer in the United States. As Perception grew with the kayak market, it expanded operations internationally to Chester, England in 1982 and New Zealand in 1986.  Masters developed and registered 30+ patents in boat design, plastics manufacturing, computers and heat transfer and used these patents to keep Perception at the forefront of the industry.

He realized early on that customer interaction would drive sales growth. During the 1990s, Perception introduced various ways to interact with prospects and customers, including a professional call center, an interactive website, and two technical field representatives to promote the sport of kayaking through education.

This early pilot program introduced kayaking to novices by offering free coaching. As Masters noted, "Coaching from a skilled trainer, and the opportunity to try any of 30 kayak designs, helps people push past their doubts and get out onto the water, paddling closer to a future kayak purchase.”

Perception continued to grow throughout the 80s and into the 90s, producing successful lines of kayaks and canoes. As early as 1984, however, Masters had begun to speak openly about vacating his role as President of the company he founded.

In 1987, Perception's sales manager, Joe Pulliam, left the company to work for Blue Hole Canoe and eventually founded Dagger Canoe. Dagger emerged as the first serious competition for Perception, although Pulliam had a two-year non-compete agreement that initially kept Dagger out of kayaks and in canoes. In 1990 Dagger introduced its first kayak, the Response.

Masters would eventually exit Perception altogether when he sold the company to Crescent Capital, which then acquired Dagger, and both companies were put under the Watermark Paddlesports holding company. Watermark was eventually acquired by Confluence Holdings, an industry platform consolidating multiple kayak and canoe brands.

In 2017, Masters was inducted into the International Whitewater Hall of Fame in the Pioneer Category. The ceremony was hosted in October, 2017 alongside the ACA National Paddlesports Conference in Bryson City, North Carolina, USA.

Peer Advisory Groups (aka Forums) 

Bill Masters is a firm believer in educating, the development of entrepreneurial skills, and mentoring, especially young entrepreneurs. He gives back by dedicating his time to numerous committees and boards, including Greenville Technical College Entrepreneurial Forum and writing a book to create and advocate for peer to peer advisory groups, Focus Forums™.  He has recently served as Chair of South Carolina Research Authority, on the SC Council on Competitiveness Composites Cluster (2006), Liberty Fellows (2005), Board of Directors for SC Launch (2005), Furman University Foundation Board (2004) and Chair, Higher Education Task Force of The Governors Map Commission.  Masters is a member of Young Presidents Organization (YPO), World Presidents Organization (WPO) and L3. He served on the YPO International Forum Advisory Board (YPO) and Chapter Forum Officer WPO.

Significant 3D Printing Patents 
United States 4665492
Filed July 2, 1984
The first 3-D patent to shoot drops of plastic and make a part in the mid-1980s
Computer automated manufacturing process and system

United States 5134569
Filed June 26, 1989
3-D printing using extrusion
System and method for computer automated manufacturing using fluent material

United States 5216616
Filed December 1, 1989
3-D printing
System and method for computer automated manufacture with reduced object shape distortion

United States 5546313
Filed September 2, 1994
3-D printing using pin array
Method and apparatus for producing three-dimensional articles from a computer generated design

United States 5694324
Filed March 6, 1995
3-D printing suited for live cell building without damage
System and method for manufacturing articles using fluent material droplets

Other Patents

Professional Organizations, Committees, and Non-profits

Awards and honors

References

1950 births
American inventors
Living people
People from Pickens, South Carolina
Clemson University alumni
People from Greenville, South Carolina